Thomas Smith (born 12 October 1973) is a Scottish former footballer. Smith played in the Scottish Premier League and Scottish Football League for Partick Thistle, Ayr United, Clydebank and Hibernian. Smith won a Second Division championship with Ayr. He moved to Hibs in January 1999 and established himself as the club's first choice left-back during the 1999–2000 season. Early in the following season he began to suffer a degenerative knee injury, however, which forced him to retire from the game aged 27. Manager Alex McLeish and managing director Rod Petrie both paid tribute to Smith's service and offered the club's assistance.

References 

1973 births
Living people
Footballers from Glasgow
Association football defenders
Scottish footballers
Partick Thistle F.C. players
Ayr United F.C. players
Clydebank F.C. (1965) players
Hibernian F.C. players
Scottish Premier League players
Scottish Football League players